The 1952 VFL Lightning Premiership was an Australian rules football knockout competition played entirely on Saturday, 24 May. It was played on the Empire Day holiday between rounds 5 and 6 of the Victorian Football League's 1952 season with all games played at the MCG. This was the fifth time a lightning premiership had been contested in the VFL. It was contested by the 12 VFL teams who competed in the 1952 VFL season. A total of 33,719 people attended the competition. Melbourne won its first Lighting Premiership competition defeating South Melbourne in the final by 7 points.

Matches

Round 1

|- bgcolor="#CCCCFF"
| Home team
| Home team score
| Away team
| Away team score
| Ground
| Date
|- bgcolor="#FFFFFF"
| Collingwood
| 4.3 (27)
| Hawthorn
| 0.4 (4)
| MCG
| Saturday, 24 May
|- bgcolor="#FFFFFF"
| Carlton
| 1.1 (7)
| Fitzroy
| 2.0 (12)
| MCG
| Saturday, 24 May
|- bgcolor="#FFFFFF"
| Essendon
| 1.2 (8)
| Melbourne
| 2.2 (14)
| MCG
| Saturday, 24 May
|- bgcolor="#FFFFFF"
| Geelong
| 1.4 (10)
| Richmond
| 1.1 (7)
| MCG
| Saturday, 24 May
|- bgcolor="#FFFFFF"
| South Melbourne
| 4.5 (29)
| St Kilda
| 0.0 (0)
| MCG
| Saturday, 24 May
|- bgcolor="#FFFFFF"
| Footscray
| 1.0 (6)
| North Melbourne
| 4.6 (30)
| MCG
| Saturday, 24 May

Quarter finals

|- bgcolor="#CCCCFF"
| Home team
| Home team score
| Away team
| Away team score
| Ground
| Date
|- bgcolor="#FFFFFF"
| Collingwood
| 1.2 (8)
| Fitzroy
| 0.0 (0)
| MCG
| Saturday, 24 May
|- bgcolor="#FFFFFF"
| Melbourne
| 4.1 (25)
| Geelong
| 1.2 (8)
| MCG
| Saturday, 24 May
|- bgcolor="#CCCCFF"
|colspan=6 style="text-align:center;"| Bye: South Melbourne, North Melbourne

Semi finals

|- bgcolor="#CCCCFF"
| Home team
| Home team score
| Away team
| Away team score
| Ground
| Date
|- bgcolor="#FFFFFF"
| South Melbourne
| 3.5 (23)
| Collingwood
| 2.1 (13)
| MCG
| Saturday, 24 May
|- bgcolor="#FFFFFF"
| North Melbourne
| 2.1 (13)
| Melbourne
| 2.5 (17)
| MCG
| Saturday, 24 May

Grand final

|- bgcolor="#CCCCFF"
| Home team
| Home team score
| Away team
| Away team score
| Ground
| Date
|- bgcolor="#FFFFFF"
| South Melbourne
| 0.1 (1)
| Melbourne
| 1.2 (8)
| MCG
| Saturday, 24 May

See also
List of Australian Football League night premiers
Australian Football League pre-season competition
1952 VFL season

Australian Football League pre-season competition
Vfl Lightning Premiership, 1952